The 1976–77 Segunda División was the 28th season of the Mexican Segunda División. The season started on 14 August 1976 and concluded on 5 June 1977. It was won by Atlante.

Changes 
 San Luis was promoted to Primera División.
 Atlante was relegated from Primera División.
 Tuberos de Veracruz was promoted from Tercera División.
 Inter Acapulco was relegated from Segunda División.
 Universidad de Nayarit was renamed as Tepic.
 Atlético Tepeji del Río moved to Ciudad Sahagún and renamed as Ciudad Sahagún. UAT moved at Ciudad Madero and renamed as Bravos.
 Naucalpan was bought by new owners, the club was moved to Cuernavaca and renamed as Morelos.
 Saltillo was bought by new owners, the club was moved to Colima City and renamed as Jaguares de Colima.
 Tapatío was moved to Autlán after Week 1.

Teams

Group stage

Group 1

Group 2

Group 3

Group 4

Results

Final stage

Group 1

Group 2

Final

References 

1976–77 in Mexican football
Segunda División de México seasons